The 1984 TCU Horned Frogs football team represented Texas Christian University (TCU) in the 1984 NCAA Division I-A football season. The Horned Frogs finished the season 8–4 overall and 5–3 in the Southwest Conference for their first winning season since 1971. The team was coached by Jim Wacker, in his second year as head coach. The Frogs played their home games in Amon G. Carter Stadium, which is located on campus in Fort Worth, Texas. They were invited to the Astro-Bluebonnet Bowl where they lost to West Virginia by a score of 14–31.

Schedule

References

TCU
TCU Horned Frogs football seasons
TCU Horned Frogs football